Shimon Mordukhovich Iakerson (Russian: Семён Мордухович Якерсон; born August 4, 1956) is a Russian scholar specializing in medieval Hebrew manuscripts and incunabula.

Career
Iakerson is the Head of the Department of Semitic and Hebrew Studies at the St. Petersburg State University, Russia. He is also the Head Researcher at the Institute of Oriental Manuscripts of the Russian Academy of Sciences, as well as a corresponding member of the Hebrew Paleography Project of the Israel Academy of Sciences and Humanities. He has lectured at a variety of academic institutions around the world, most recently at Sorbonne in Paris, France. One of his most notable lecture series was "Collectors and Collections: Hebrew Manuscripts and Incunabula in Russia" delivered on 23–24 May 2010 at the Penn Libraries in Philadelphia, USA, organized jointly with the Jewish Studies Program and the Herbert D. Katz Center for Advanced Judaic Studies.  In recent years he has become involved with Jewish museology and the presentation of Jewish history to larger audiences, for a period of time serving as a curator at the Judaica collections of the Russian Museum of Ethnography. Later was the head chair of in St. Petersburg State University and the leading researcher in the Department of Hebrew Manuscripts of the Russian Academy of Sciences.

Achievements
Since 1985, Iakerson has produced 49 publications on Jewish history and Hebrew incunabula. His works have been published in Russian, Hebrew, French, Dutch and English. 
His opus magnum is the Catalogue of Hebrew Incunabula from the Collection of the Library of the Jewish Theological Seminary of America, wherein he describes the largest collection of Hebrew books printed with movable type before 1501 A.D. He holds the first Honorable Medal of the Euro-Asian Jewish Congress “For Service to the Jewish People” (28 July 2005, Jerusalem) for the publication of his 2005 Catalogue of Hebrew Incunabula from the Collection of the Library of the Jewish Theological Seminary of America and is a winner of the Antsiferov award in Saint-Petersburg studies for the 2008-2009 publication of the illustrated volume Jewish Treasures of Petersburg.

Family
Daughters:
 Dina (born 1983) — Israeli art historian and artist. She born in St. Petersburg, immigrated to Israel (1990). She lives in Tel Aviv.
 Maria (born 1994).

Bibliography of Individual Works

1. От буквы к литере. Очерки по истории еврейской средневековой книги / From Letter to Type. Essays on the History of the Medieval Hebrew Book. Санкт-Петербург, 2016. 391 с.

2. ОЦАР СЕФАРАД - СЕФАРДСКАЯ СОКРОВИЩНИЦА. Сефардская книга X – XV вв.  От рукописной к печатной традиции. Учебно-методическое пособие для студентов СПбГУ, обучающихся по направлению «Востоковедение и африканистика». Санкт-Петербург, 2015. 128 с., илл.

3. Наставление Иуды Ибн Тиббона сыну Самуилу, сочиненное во дни юности оного. Факсимиле рукописи. Пролегомена, критическое издание текста, перевод с иврита, глоссарий и указатели С. М. Якерсона. Поэтический перевод пролога и эпилога Е. К. Юзбашян. СПб, 2011. 200 с., илл.

4. Еврейские сокровища Петербурга. [Т. 2] Ашкеназские коллекции Российского этнографического музея. СПб, 2009. 231 с., ил. [в соавт.: Урицкая Л.Б.].

5. Еврейские сокровища Петербурга. Свитки, кодексы, документы. СПб, 2008. 264 с., ил.

6. Агнон Ш. И. Первый поцелуй / Перевод, предисловие и комментарии
С. М. Якерсона. СПб.: Центр «Петербургское востоковедение», 2006. 24 с.

7. Большая Хоральная Синагога в Санкт-Петербурге. СПб.: «Конструкт», 2006.

8. Abraham Firkovich de Karaïet en zijn verzameling Hebreeuwse en Samaritaanse
manuscripten in Sint-Petersburg. Amsterdam, 2005. 39 p. (Printed in Dutch)

9. Еврейская рукописная и первопечатная книга X—XV вв. как историко-культурный источник / Автореферат диссертации на соискание ученой степени
доктора исторических наук. СПб., 2005. 57 с.

10. Catalogue of Hebrew Incunabula from the Collection of the Library of the Jewish Theological Seminary of America. Vol. 1—2. New York and Jerusalem. 2004—2005. (Parallel text in English and Hebrew).

11. Уникальное Пятикнижие из собрания барона Гинцбурга. [М., 2004]. 12 с. (приложение к факсимильному изданию памятника. Text in Russian and English).

12. Еврейская средневековая книга: Кодикологические, палеографические и книговедческие аспекты. М., 2003. 256 с.

13. Избранные жемчужины. Уникальные памятники еврейской культуры в Санкт-Петербурге (рукописи, документы, инкунабулы, культовая утварь). Санкт-Петербург, 2003. 144 с. (Parallel text in Russian and English).

14. Ohel Hayim: A Catalogue of Hebrew Manuscripts of the Manfred and Anne Lehmann
Family. Vol. 3: Printed Books. Incunabula and Sixteenth Century Books. New York,
1996. [49], 314, XXIII pp. (The Manfred and Anne Lehmann Foundation Series. 22). (In English and Hebrew).

15. Инкунабулы на семитских языках (древнееврейском и арамейском) и их место в европейской книжной культуре XV века / Автореферат диссертации на соискание ученой степени кандидата филологических наук. Л., 1989. 16 с.

16. Еврейские инкунабулы. Описание экземпляров, хранящихся в библиотеках Москвы и Ленинграда. Ленинград, 1988. 337 с.

17. Каталог инкунабулов на древнееврейском языке библиотеки Ленинградского отделения Института востоковедения АН СССР. Ленинград, 1985. 107 с.

References

In 2 vols. "New York and Jerusalem: The Jewish Theological Seminary of America," 2004–2005.
“Speaker biography” in Shimon Iakerson, “Unique Hebrew Manuscripts in Saint-Petersburg, Russia,” a lecture delivered at the Library of Congress on February 3, 2010, and available at https://www.loc.gov/today/cyberlc/feature_wdesc.php?rec=4841 .
“Shimon Mordukhovich Iakerson,” The Institute of Oriental Manuscripts of the Russian Academy of Sciences, http://www.orientalstudies.ru/eng/index.php?option=com_personalities&Itemid=74&person=215.
https://www.ephe.fr/international/directeurs-d-etudes-invites/shimon-iakerson

20th-century Russian historians
21st-century Russian historians